Garudinodes is a genus of moths in the family Erebidae. The genus was erected by George Thomas Bethune-Baker in 1908.

Species
 Garudinodes albiceps Rothschild, 1912
 Garudinodes albofasciata Rothschild, 1912
 Garudinodes bicolorana Bethune-Baker, 1908
 Garudinodes castaneus Rothschild, 1912
 Garudinodes trizona Hampson, 1911

References

Nudariina
Moth genera